Captains Mountain is a mountain located in the locality of Captains Mountain near Millmerran in the Toowoomba Region, Queensland, Australia.

References

Mountains of Queensland
Darling Downs